Julio Labandeira (born 12 August 1949) is an Argentine sailor. He competed in the Star event at the 1988 Summer Olympics.

References

External links
 

1949 births
Living people
Argentine male sailors (sport)
Olympic sailors of Argentina
Sailors at the 1988 Summer Olympics – Star
Place of birth missing (living people)